The Goldendale Sentinel is a newspaper that covers local news about Goldendale and the surrounding Klickitat county region of the U.S. state of Washington. It is the oldest paper in eastern Washington. The paper began publication in 1884 when two papers, the Klickitat Sentinel (founded 1879) and Goldendale Gazette, were purchased and merged. It is recognized by Klickitat County as a community media source. Lou Marzeles is the current editor and publisher of the paper. It is owned by Tartan Publications Inc., Leslie Geatches, President.

References

External links
 Official Website

Publications established in 1879
Newspapers published in Washington (state)